The São Tomé clingfish (Apletodon wirtzi) is a species of marine fish of the family Gobiesocidae (clingfish). It grows to 1.4 cm maximal length. It occurs in the eastern Atlantic Ocean, around the islands of São Tomé and Príncipe between 0 and 3 metres depth. The species was first described in 2007 by Ronald Fricke, its specific name honouring the collector of the type, marine biologist Peter Wirtz of Madeira.

References

Fish of the Atlantic Ocean
Taxa named by Ronald Fricke
Fish described in 2007
São Tomé clingfish
Endemic vertebrates of São Tomé and Príncipe